Peter Curran (born 15 July 1962) is a former Australian rules footballer who played with Hawthorn and the Brisbane Bears in the VFL/AFL.

A courageous strong-marking forward, Curran played an important part in the most successful era in Hawthorn's history, the 1980s. After a disappointing loss in the 1984 Grand Final, Curran found greater success in 1985, playing in the upset 9 point win over Essendon in the Foster's Cup night Grand Final and in the come-from-behind reserves Grand Final victory against Carlton.  He was a member of their premiership sides in 1986 and 1989. In the 1989 Grand Final he contributed 3 goals.

Although he never kicked over 50 goals in a season he came close, managing 46 in 1984 and 44 in 1987. He moved to Brisbane in 1991 and joined the Bears, playing with the club for his final two seasons. He won a reserves premiership with the club in 1991.

After his playing career ended he tried various coaching jobs before eventually securing the job of Adelaide Crows assistant coach, and later Melbourne. He is currently employed as a Senior Years English teacher and Head Coach of Football at Wesley College, Melbourne.

References

External links

1962 births
Living people
Australian rules footballers from Victoria (Australia)
Hawthorn Football Club players
Hawthorn Football Club Premiership players
Brisbane Bears players
South Launceston Football Club players
Australia international rules football team players
People educated at Marcellin College, Bulleen
Two-time VFL/AFL Premiership players